Grand Duchess Catherine Mikhailovna of Russia (28 August 1827 – 12 May 1894), was the third of five daughters of Grand Duke Michael Pavlovich of Russia (youngest son of Emperor Paul I) and Princess Charlotte of Württemberg (known as Grand Duchess Elena Pavlovna after marriage). She was also the wife of Duke Georg August of Mecklenburg-Strelitz.

She was a great philanthropist and many of the organisations she supported and helped to create still operate today.

Biography

Early life 

Catherine was born on 28 August 1827 in Saint Petersburg, Russian Empire, almost certainly in the recently completed Mikhailovsky Palace that was the primary residence of her parents. She was a younger sister of Grand Duchess Maria Mikhailovna of Russia and Grand Duchess Elizabeth Mikhailovna of Russia, as well as an older sister of Grand Duchess Alexandra Mikhailovna of Russia and Grand Duchess Anna Mikhailovna of Russia.

Her mother took a great interest in her daughters and was very involved in their childhoods, raising them relatively strictly and personally selecting their teachers in subjects such as foreign languages, singing, and drawing. Unfortunately, Anna and Alexandra died in childhood while Elizabeth and Maria died only a year apart in 1845 and 1846 respectively. This meant that for much of her life, her mother had only Catherine on whom to focus her attention.

Also in 1846, Catherine became 'Chief' of the Sergievsky Dragoon Regiment which would later receive her name, but the regiment disbanded in 1851. She received another regiment in 1856 which became known as "Her Imperial Majesty's Dragoon Regiment, Grand Duchess Ekaterina Mikhailovna."

In 1849, Catherine's father died suddenly at the age of fifty-one whilst in Warsaw, which spurred her mother to begin the charitable work that would be the legacy of both herself and Catherine.

Marriage and Issue 
On 16 February 1851, Catherine married Duke Georg Alexander of Mecklenburg-Strelitz in St. Petersburg. Catherine "loved her husband deeply and selflessly," despite a three-year age gap and the disapproval of her mother. Although the young couple ended up settling in the Mikhailovsky Palace with Elena, she supposedly did not get along very well with Georg. Nevertheless, the marriage produced five children of whom three lived to adulthood.

On 12 July 1854, Catherine gave birth to a son named Nikolaus (or Nikolai) who "died immediately by birth."

On 16 January 1857, the couple's only surviving daughter was born and named Elena, presumably for Catherine's mother. Elena would go on to marry Prince Albert of Saxe-Altenburg and become Duchess Helene of Mecklenburg-Strelitz. After her husband's death she remarried, but had no issue from either husband.

Catherine's third child, Duke Georg Alexander of Mecklenburg-Strelitz, was born on 6 June 1859 at the family's estate in Remplin, Germany. He would marry one of Catherine's ladies in waiting, Natalia Feodorovna Vanljarskaya, and have four children. Catherine severely disapproved of the marriage, and it became a point of contention between herself and her son until her death.

Another daughter was born sometime in 1861 named Maria-Frederica who died soon after her birth.

Finally on 17 June 1863, Catherine gave birth to her final child, Charles Michael, Duke of Mecklenburg, at Oranienbaum, Russia. He would never marry nor have issue, but lived much of his life in Russia and managed to flee shortly after being arrested following the February Revolution.

Her husband died in June 1876 at the age of fifty, and Catherine would outlive him by eighteen years.

Later life and extensive charitable works 
Catherine enjoyed a high position in St. Petersburg society, having her own court, and was "a strict woman, well aware of herself and her rank." She was often seen in somewhat old-fashioned dresses containing much lace.

By 1870, she had been made chairwoman of the St. Petersburg Women's Patriotic Society, which she had been a member of since 1847 and began to devote more time to helping her mother with some of her foundations.

When her mother died in 1873, Catherine inherited the Mikhailovsky Palace which she used to continue many traditions begun by Elena involving the use of the palace for various arts and handicrafts exhibitions. She also began to take much more of an interest in the work begun by her mother and the list of charities she was patroness to grew exponentially. An incredibly small selection of these charities and organisations includes:

 the St. Helena School
 the Elisabeth Hospital for Young Children
 the Clinical Institute (now the Institute for Advanced Medical Studies)
 the Frebelev Society
 the Berlin Society of Art Lovers

She was also known to help almost everyone who applied to her for monetary assistance via petitions which she accepted each year around the major holidays.

When Alexander II of Russia was assassinated in 1881, Catherine was asked by the mayor of St. Petersburg to help arrange a memorial to the Tsar. She accepted and even offered some of her own land adjacent to the Mikhailovsky Palace for it on the condition that the nearby trees were preserved as many of them had been there since the reign of Peter the Great.

Death and inheritance 
At some point in either late 1893 or early 1894, Catherine became seriously ill with Influenza. While on her deathbed, she summoned Alexander III of Russia in order to approve the will she had had written. He inquired briefly about who had written it, but signed it directly and without first reading it.

When Catherine finally died on 12 May 1894, she was buried in the Saints Peter and Paul Cathedral, Saint Petersburg after a funeral procession from the Mikhailovsky Palace led by the Emperor himself.

After the funeral, her will was examined and two issues were discovered. Firstly, she had practically disinherited her son Georg on account of his marriage, but asked, "May God grant them happiness and prosperity." Secondly and most importantly, she had left the Mikhailovsky Palace to the princes of Mecklenburg-Strelitz (i.e. her daughter and youngest son) rather than the Imperial family. This was a problem as she did not technically own the palace, it had been effectively on loan to her father and then to her, but upon her death should have reverted to the Imperial family as her heirs were not members of the Russian Orthodox Church.

Sergei Witte recalled that, "The Emperor once said that it was very unpleasant for him that this historic palace, which belongs to the Imperial House, had passed, by some misunderstanding, into the hands of these princes." He did not consider attempting to overrule the will, however, on account of the facts that Catherine had been very well respected in society and the whole ordeal was really his own fault as he did sign the will without reviewing its contents.

Awards 

 Grand Cross of the Order of Saint Catherine

Ancestry

References

External links
 

1827 births
1894 deaths
House of Holstein-Gottorp-Romanov
Russian grand duchesses
19th-century people from the Russian Empire
19th-century women from the Russian Empire
Duchesses of Mecklenburg-Strelitz
Burials at Saints Peter and Paul Cathedral, Saint Petersburg